Peter Etzenbach (October 25, 1889 – June 12, 1976) was a German politician of the Christian Democratic Union (CDU) and former member of the German Bundestag.

Life 
Etzenbach was a member of the German Bundestag from the first federal election in 1949 to 1961. He represented, always directly elected, the constituency of Siegkreis in Parliament.

Literature

References

1889 births
1976 deaths
Members of the Bundestag for North Rhine-Westphalia
Members of the Bundestag 1957–1961
Members of the Bundestag 1953–1957
Members of the Bundestag 1949–1953
Members of the Bundestag for the Christian Democratic Union of Germany